National Labour Party can refer to:

Czechoslovakia
 National Labour Party (Czechoslovakia, 1925)
 National Labour Party (Czechoslovakia, 1938)

United Kingdom
National Labour Organisation (UK, 1931–47)
National Labour Party (UK, 1957)
Labour Electoral Association, sometimes known as the National Labour Party from 1887 onwards
Labour Party (UK)

Elsewhere
National Labor Party (Australia)
National Labour Party (Benin)
National Labor Party, former name of Podemos (Brazil)
National Labour Party (Ghana 2015)
National Labour Party (Ireland)
National Labour Party (Jamaica)
National Labour Party (Kenya)
 National Labour Party, former name of HUN Party in Mongolia

See also
List of political parties by name
National Party (disambiguation)
Labour Party (disambiguation)
Democratic Labour Party (disambiguation)